Michał Buchalik (born 3 February 1989 in Rybnik) is a Polish professional footballer who plays as a goalkeeper for Lechia Gdańsk.

Career

Club
In July 2011, he joined Lechia Gdańsk on a three-year contract.

References

External links 
 

1989 births
Living people
People from Rybnik
Polish footballers
Association football goalkeepers
Odra Wodzisław Śląski players
Lechia Gdańsk players
Lechia Gdańsk II players
Wisła Kraków players
Ruch Chorzów players
Ekstraklasa players
I liga players
III liga players
IV liga players
Sportspeople from Silesian Voivodeship